Cycling in the United States is a minor sport in the country. It is also a mode of transport, particularly in urban areas.

As a mode of transport

History 
Bicycling has been used as a mode of transport in the U.S. since the country's inception.

It experienced a rise in popularity in the 21st century, as people sought to escape the congestion and reduce their environmental impact. Research shows that cycling is not only environmentally-friendly but is also beneficial to one's mental, physical, and social health. Activists and organizations such as the League of American Bicyclists campaigned for safer bicycle infrastructure. However, recent efforts to increase cycling in the United States have been insufficient, and the number of people who ride their bikes continues to plummet from 2014-2019.

Recently, many American cities have started to promote cycling due to economic and educational opportunities, following what many European countries did in the past decades where they reclaimed space in the urban landscape from cars. National Geographic author Ilana Strauss suggests a direct correlation between perceived safety features like protected bike lanes and the amount of cyclists on the road.

Law

Demographics 
According to a research article by Harry Oosterhuis, American cyclists' demographics mostly consist of men, students, and youngsters. Cycling advocates have asserted that low-income and minority communities also see a much lower percentage of cyclists due to the disproportionately low access to bicycle infrastructures.

Culture 
The United States is generally considered as one of the least bicycle-friendly countries in the world. Compared to the Netherlands, where 27 percent of workers commute on a bike, America has an 1 percent of trips being completed on a bicycle. Many speculate that the lack of use of bicycles usage in the United States is because of the dominance of cars. However, some studies suggest that the socioeconomic and sociocultural characteristics of the United States are also contributing factors.

Ralph Buehler, John Pucher, and Adrian Bauman,  authors of Journal of Transport & Health, conducted a logistic regression research where they concluded the aforementioned factors are proven to be "substantial" when it comes to its impact on cycling. They concluded that women, children, and low-income communities are often ignored when new cycling facilities are being built.

Another article by Journal of Transport Geography suggests that this socioeconomic inequality regarding bicycle infrastructure is due to the belief of a higher demand for said infrastructure in dense and urban areas, which is generally linked to high-income, high-education communities. The authors also suggested a motivating factor of bicycle infrastructure development is its economic potential of returning highly educated Americans back to the cities.

As a sport 

Lance Armstrong was one of the United States' most successful cyclists.

Ayesha McGowan became the first African American female professional road cyclist. Major Taylor was the first African American world champion in cycling.

See also

 Cycling in Chicago
 Cycling in Detroit
 Cycling in New York City
 Cycling in San Francisco
 Cycling in San Jose, California

References

 
Cycle racing in the United States